Jordan Wright (born 27 February 1999) is an English professional footballer who plays for Lincoln City as a goalkeeper.

Career
Wright began his career with Nottingham Forest, spending time on loan during the 2016–17 and 2017–18 seasons with Alfreton Town and Kettering Town. In November 2018 he signed for Grantham Town  on loan, and in September 2019 he moved on loan to Nuneaton Borough.

He returned on loan to Alfreton Town in December 2019. The loan was extended in February 2020. He also moved on loan to Alloa Athletic in January 2021, and to Hereford in October 2021.

He signed permanently for Lincoln City in January 2022, making his debut for the club on 5 March 2022, appearing as a late substitute following an injury to first-choice goalkeeper Josh Griffiths. Wright's performances impressed, although the club was searching for a replacement for Griffiths.

In September 2022 he was nominated for the EFL Cup Player of the Second Round, following his display against Barrow, saving three-penalties in a shootout and denying several attempts during the game.

Career statistics

References

1999 births
Living people
English footballers
Nottingham Forest F.C. players
Alfreton Town F.C. players
Kettering Town F.C. players
Grantham Town F.C. players
Nuneaton Borough F.C. players
Alloa Athletic F.C. players
Hereford F.C. players
Lincoln City F.C. players
English Football League players
Association football goalkeepers
National League (English football) players